Mamiellales are an order of green algae in the class Mamiellophyceae. Their cells and flagella are covered with spiderweb-like scales of several types. Some species lack scales but possess pigments similar to those of the scale-bearing species.

Taxonomy 
Order Mamiellales Moestrup 1984 [Micromonadales]
 Family Bathycoccaceae Marin & Melkonian 2010
 Genus Bathycoccus Eikrem & Throndsen 1990
 Genus Ostreococcus Courties & Chrétiennot-Dinet 1995
 Family Mamiellaceae Moestrup 1984
 Genus Mamiella Moestrup 1984
 Genus Mantoniella Desikachary 1972
 Genus Micromonas Manton & Parke 1960 non Borrel 1902

References

Chlorophyta orders
Mamiellophyceae